Cuyapo, officially the Municipality of Cuyapo, is a 1st class municipality in the province of Nueva Ecija, Philippines. According to the 2020 census, it has a population of 68,066 people.

Etymology

Cuyapo comes from the Pangasinan word “kuyapo”, “kiapo” or “quiapo” in Tagalog; “lul-luan”, in Ilocano; (Pistia stratiotes), a water plant that looks like a flower. According to the Kulantong, or Cronologia written by Cirilo R. Sumangil, a native of Cuyapo, who, for over forty years, was the Parish Priest of the Philippine Independent Church of Cuyapo. 

Said aquatic plant was so abundant particularly in a place which is now owned by the Monteros, situated along Rizal Street near the Municipal Cemetery. It was at this place that lured cow tenders from Paniqui, Tarlac to pasture their herds or flocks.

History

Early Beginnings
Pangasinenses from Paniqui, Tarlac who used to pasture their cattle, foresters from Santa Maria, Narvacan, Ilocos Sur; Paoay and Batac in Ilocos Norte; and Pangasinenses from Calasiao and San Carlos, Pangasinan, settled in great number in the town. It is said that the exodus, particularly from Ilocos Sur, was due to the forced labor enforced by the Spaniards in the construction of the Catholic Church in Santa Maria, Ilocos Sur. Cuyapo was declared a Barrio of Rosales on September 25, 1849, with Senior Santiago Vergara as its first Teniente del Barrio. Rosales was then a part of Nueva Ecija. It was in 1901 during the American Civil Commission that Rosales, together with Balungao, Umingan, San Quintin, were segregated from Nueva Ecija and became parts of Pangasinan.

Creation of the Town
On October 29, 1859, Cuyapo was separated from Rosales, Pangasinan and made a full-fledged town with Don Juan Pangalilingan as the first Gobernadorcillo. It was during his term that the first Catholic Church and convent was constructed. The old road to Guimba, passing through what is now Barangay Maycaban was constructed. On October 29, 1959, Cuyapo celebrated the centennial of its creation as a town.

The Revolutionary Period
On July 1, 1898, Gen. Mariano Llanera, then Military Governor of Nueva Ecija, appointed Don Marcelo Garcia, last Capitan Municipal during the Spanish Regime, as Presidente Municipal with Don Mariano Flores, last Teniente Mayor, as Vise Presidente Municipal. Later, under the supervisonal government, election of municipal officials was held. This revolutionary period of government existed until the American forces came in November 1898. It was during this period when the people showed their patriotism and loyalty to the cause of the revolution. On June 19, 1898, two to three hundred Cuyapenos, under Teniente Isabelo del Valle of Paniqui, Tarlac, answered the call of duty and ambushed a heavily armed contingent of Spanish Cazadores who came from Rosales en route to Tarlac in Bessang (now part of Barangay Maycaban. The Cuyapenos then had only fifteen (15) Remington rifles and the rest armed with bolos.

Geography

Barangays
Cuyapo is politically subdivided into 51 barangays.

Climate

Demographics

Economy

Tourism
 Apolinario Mabini Marker (Cuyapo) - Site of the arrest of Philippine hero Apolinario Mabini, known as “the sublime paralytic,” by the Americans on December 10, 1899.
Armando's Garden Resort and Villas
Colosboa Hills - Tagged as the “New Zealand of Cuyapo” the “Colosboa Hills” is a vast green mountain range perfect for camping, photoshoots, and a biking destination. located at Barangay Colosboa in the Municipality of Cuyapo. Colosboa Hills, Cuyapo, Nueva Ecija.
Mount Bulaylay Zipline - located at Brgy. Landig, Cuyapo, Nueva Ecija. Mt. Bulaylay and Mt. Bangkay. These towering mounds of rock and soil hold another new adventure destination in Nueva Ecija. Mt. Bulaylay, towering at 286 meters above sea level, is a multi-peak mountain with zipline equipment that can whisk a tandem ride 
Paitan Lake - located at Paitan Sur, Cuyapo, Nueva Ecija. A serene lake that holds a mystical past poise as a next tourist destination too – that is Paitang Lake discovered by Don Cornelio Sumangil in 1885. Roughly about 15-18 kilometers from Cuyapo’s town proper.

Education

Primary schools
Public Schools:

Private Schools:

Secondary schools
Public Schools:

Villaflores Integrated School
Private Schools:

References

External links

Cuyapo Website
 [ Philippine Standard Geographic Code]
Philippine Census Information
Local Governance Performance Management System

Municipalities of Nueva Ecija